Labichthys is a genus of eels in the snipe-eel family Nemichthyidae. It currently contains the following species:

 Labichthys carinatus T. N. Gill and Ryder, 1883
 Labichthys yanoi (Mead & Rubinoff, 1966) (Yano's snipe-eel)

References

 

Nemichthyidae
Taxa named by Theodore Gill
Taxa named by John A. Ryder
Marine fish genera